The 2012–13 season was the 91st in the history of U.S. Sassuolo Calcio and their fifth consecutive season in the top flight. The club participated in Serie B and Coppa Italia.

Players

Pre-season and friendlies

Competitions

Overall record

Serie B

League table

Results summary

Results by round

Matches

Coppa Italia

References

U.S. Sassuolo Calcio seasons
Sassuolo